László Nyers (14 April 1934 – 22 January 2013) was a Hungarian wrestler. He competed in the men's freestyle +97 kg at the 1968 Summer Olympics.

References

External links
 

1934 births
2013 deaths
Hungarian male sport wrestlers
Olympic wrestlers of Hungary
Wrestlers at the 1968 Summer Olympics
Sportspeople from Somogy County
20th-century Hungarian people